Akam (English: Inside) is an Indian Malayalam language thriller drama film written and directed by Shalini Usha Nair. The film is a contemporary retelling of Malayattoor Ramakrishnan's classic psycho-thriller novel Yakshi (1967). The story is about Srini (Fahadh Faasil), a young architect, who starts suspecting that his beautiful wife Ragini (Anumol) is a yakshi.

The film was shot in and around Trivandrum and its surrounding suburbs. It premiered at the 8th Dubai International Film Festival in December 2011. It was also screened at the Shanghai International Film Festival and International Film Festival of Kerala. The film released in theatres on 26 April 2013.

Plot
Srinivasan is a young architect. He is happy when he gets a good job and a beautiful girlfriend, Tara. But then an accident disfigures him. Tara leaves him and Srinivasan, now sans his confidence, withdraws into his shell. Then he meets the beautiful Ragini who is willing to accept him despite his disfigurement. They get married, but after a while, he doubts the true identity of this woman. He doubts that this woman is human. From there the story develops.

Cast
 Fahadh Faasil as Srini
 Anumol as Ragini
 Prakash Bare
 Shelly Kishore
 Sajitha Madathil

Critical reception
Veeyen from Nowrunning.com says: "Somber and extremely suspenseful, the illusory texture of its narrative turns out to be of a class of its own."

Film festival screenings
The film was screened at the following festivals:
 December 2011: Dubai International Film Festival
 December 2011: International Film Festival of Kerala
 June 2012: Shanghai International Film Festival (World Panorama section)

See also
 Yakshi, a 1968 film adaptation of the novel

References

External links
 
 
 Lure of the enigma (Khaleej Times)

2011 films
2010s Malayalam-language films
2011 psychological thriller films
Indian psychological thriller films
Films based on thriller novels
Films based on Indian novels
Works by Malayattoor Ramakrishnan
Films shot in Thiruvananthapuram